Hezhou (Chinese 河州话 Hézhōuhuà) is a creolized mixed language spoken in Gansu Province, China. It has been the lingua franca of Linxia (formerly Hezhou) for several centuries. It is based on Uyghur and perhaps Salar. It has been relexified by Mandarin Chinese, so that nearly all roots are of Chinese origin, but grammatically it remains a Turkic language, with six noun cases, agglutinative morphology and an SOV word order. Grammatical suffixes are either Turkic or Chinese in origin; in the latter case they have been divorced from their original function and bear little to no relation to Chinese semantics. The phonology is largely Chinese, with three tones, though Hezhou tone sandhi is unusual from a Chinese perspective. It may be that Hezhou tone differs between ethnic Chinese, Hui, Dongxiang and Bao'an speakers, though there is no indication that such differences occur among native speakers.

Hezhou was once thought to be a Chinese language that had undergone heavy Turkic influence with an ongoing loss of tone; it is now believed to be the opposite, with tone acquisition perhaps ongoing.

History 
Hezhou language began to form in the Yuan dynasty. In that time, a large number of speakers of Mongolian and Turkic languages entered the Hezhou area, and some elements of those languages were mixed with Mandarin Chinese. Studies suggest that Hezhou was also influenced by the Tibetan and Monguor languages.

Starting in the late 1970s, linguists began to research the Hezhou language. It is unknown if the language was studied before that.

References 

Chinese-based pidgins and creoles
Mixed languages
Pidgins and creoles
Uyghur language
Tonal languages
Subject–object–verb languages